Gümüşdere (Homshetsi dialect: Xeluket) is a village in the Kemalpaşa District, Artvin Province, Turkey. Its population is 227 (2021).

References

Villages in Kemalpaşa District